Mary Johnson (born Astrid Maria Carlsson; 11 May 1896 – 15 May 1975) was a Swedish film actress of the silent era.

Biography
Astrid Maria Carlsson was born in Fors parish, Södermanland, Sweden. She debuted in the 1910s in the theater company  of director Karin Swanström  (1873–1942). 
In 1914, together with her first husband Karl Gerhard Johnson (1891–1964), she went to the Nya Teatern  in Gothenburg acting under the direction of theatre manager Hjalmar Selander  (1859–1928).

During the 1920s, she moved to Berlin and appeared as a leading lady in a number of German films. In 1932, she married  German film actor, Rudolf Klein-Rogge (1885–1955). She died at Brännkyrka and was buried in the memorial grove of Skogskyrkogården in Stockholm.

Selected filmography
 Sir Arne's Treasure (1919)
 Robinson i skärgården (1920)
 A Fortune Hunter (1921)
 Johan Ulfstjerna (1923)
 The Voice of the Heart (1924)
 The Telephone Operator (1925)
 Dagfin (1926)
 State Attorney Jordan (1926)
 The House of Lies (1926)
 The Strange Case of Captain Ramper (1927)
 Caught in Berlin's Underworld (1927)
 Artists (1928)
 Life's Circus (1928)
 Sex in Chains (1928)

References

Bibliography
 Kwiatkowski, Aleksander. Swedish Film Classics. Courier Dover Publications, 2013.
 William B. Parrill. European Silent Films on Video: A Critical Guide. McFarland, 2006.

Further reading

External links

1896 births
1975 deaths
Swedish film actresses
Swedish stage actresses
Swedish emigrants to Germany